Spectamen multistriatum is a species of sea snail, a marine gastropod mollusk in the family Solariellidae.

Description
The size of the shell attains 8.5 mm.

Distribution
This marine species occurs off Transkei to Western Cape Province, Rep. South Africa

References

External links
 To World Register of Marine Species

multistriatum
Gastropods described in 1925